Thiago Leitão Polieri (born 12 June 1978) is a Brazilian football manager and former player who played as a midfielder.

Playing career
Born in Campinas, São Paulo, Leitão was a Ponte Preta youth graduate. After making his first team debut, he represented Internacional de Santa Maria and Ceará before moving to Bolivia in 2002, to join Jorge Wilstermann.

In 2005, Leitão signed for Portuguese Segunda Liga side F.C. Marco, but returned to Bolivia in the following year with Oriente Petrolero. In 2008, he agreed to a contract with The Strongest, and had a subsequent short stint at local side União Barbarense before returning to the club in 2009.

In 2013, after spending some time without a club, Leitão joined Sport Boys Warnes in the Copa Simón Bolívar. He retired in the following year, after helping the club in their promotion to Primera División.

Managerial career
In 2017, Leitão returned to Wilstermann as Álvaro Peña's assistant. In August 2018, after a fight with Argentine midfielder Cristian Chávez, he was sacked by the club.

In April 2019, Leitão was named manager of Aurora. He left the club in May, after his contract expired.

On 2 March 2021, Leitão was appointed manager of San José. He resigned from the club late in the month, to take over fellow league team Atlético Palmaflor.

On 16 December 2022, Leitão was named manager of Blooming for the upcoming season, but was sacked after just three matches.

References

External links
 
 
 
 

1978 births
Living people
Sportspeople from Campinas
Brazilian footballers
Association football midfielders
Campeonato Brasileiro Série B players
Associação Atlética Ponte Preta players
Esporte Clube Internacional players
Ceará Sporting Club players
União Agrícola Barbarense Futebol Clube players
Bolivian Primera División players
C.D. Jorge Wilstermann players
Oriente Petrolero players
Club Bolívar players
The Strongest players
Sport Boys Warnes players
Liga Portugal 2 players
F.C. Marco players
Brazilian expatriate footballers
Brazilian expatriate sportspeople in Portugal
Expatriate footballers in Portugal
Brazilian football managers
Bolivian Primera División managers
Club Aurora managers
Brazilian expatriate football managers
Expatriate football managers in Bolivia
C.D. Palmaflor del Trópico managers
Club San José managers
Club Blooming managers
Bolivian footballers
Bolivian football managers